Ricardo Tirloni (born February 3, 1983) is a Brazilian mixed martial artist who competes in the Lightweight division. A professional MMA competitor since 2005, Tirloni has fought in various promotions, including Bellator, the MFC, and Pancrase.

Mixed martial arts career

Early career
Tirloni holds a black belt in Brazilian Jiu-Jitsu and trains at Ataque Duplo with the likes of Thiago Tavares and Nazareno Malegarie. In Tirloni's early career, he fought at MFC 17 against Benson Henderson, who would later go on to become the UFC Lightweight champion. Tirloni did not have a training team at the time, but was still competitive throughout the bout. He was able to knock Henderson down in the first round and had Henderson in a deep triangle choke in the second round. However, in the third round, Tirloni tired after a long period of wrestling with Henderson and he was forced to tap after Henderson caught him with a guillotine choke in the final round. Tirloni was otherwise unbeaten, recording thirteen victories prior to joining Bellator.

Bellator Fighting Championships
In late 2011, Tirloni joined Bellator Fighting Championships. He made his promotional debut against Steve Gable at Bellator 55. Tirloni was able to land multiple knees to Gable's head and body, as well as stop Gable's takedown attempts. Tirloni got into top position on the ground and was able to open up a cut above Gable's left eye. After Gable rolled onto his stomach, Tirloni locked in a rear naked choke, stopping the fight at 3:54 of the second round.

Tirloni was then booked to fight Chris Horodecki at Bellator 57, just three weeks after his win over Gable. However, Tirloni dislocated his ribs in training and was forced to withdraw from the bout. Tirloni was later entered into Bellator's season six lightweight tournament which began at Bellator 62. His opponent was Rick Hawn, a former United States representative in Judo at the 2004 Olympic Games. Hawn was also the runner-up of the previous season's welterweight tournament. Tirloni was able to land with a few leg kicks, but Hawn was able to continue pressing forward. Hawn then landed a right hand which dropped Tirloni. Hawn hit Tirloni with punches and hammerfists on the ground and the fight was stopped at 2:36 of the opening round.

Tirloni then entered into the Season 7 Lightweight tournament. He faced Rene Nazare in the opening round at Bellator 77. He won the fight via submission in the second round. He faced Dave Jansen in the semifinals on November 16, 2012 at Bellator 81 and lost via controversial split decision.

Tirloni competed in the Bellator Season 8 Lightweight tournament, fighting American Will Brooks in the opening round at Bellator 87 on January 31, 2013. Tirloni was defeated by unanimous decision (30-27, 30-27, 30-27).

Tirloni faced Rich Clementi on September 27, 2013 at Bellator 101 in the Quarterfinals of the Season Nine Lightweight tournament. He won the fight via unanimous decision.

Tirloni faced Alexander Sarnavskiy in the semifinal round and lost via submission in the first round.

Post-Bellator career
Tirloni faced Esteban Bonaveri at Arena Tour 2: Malegarie vs. Guerra on March 22, 2014. He won the fight via corner stoppage TKO.

In June 2015, Tirloni defeated fellow Bellator veteran E. J. Brooks in the main event of Arena Tour 6.

Mixed martial arts record

|-
|Loss
|align=center|24–8
|Shamil Zavurov
|TKO (punches)
|Eagle Fighting Championship 37
|
|align=center|2
|align=center|2:12
|Almaty, Kazakhstan
|
|-
|Win
|align=center|24–7
|Ramon Cardozo
|Submission (anaconda choke)
|Brave CF 15:Colombia
|
|align=center|2
|align=center|0:32
|Bucaramanga, Colombia
|
|-
|Loss
|align=center|23–7
|Akira Okada 
|Decision (unanimous)
|Pancrase 293
|
|align=center|3
|align=center|5:00
|Tokyo, Japan
|
|-
|Win
|align=center|23–6
|Enrique Marín
|KO (punch)
|Fight Club Slam 2017
|
|align=center|1
|align=center|3:16
|Leganes, Spain
|
|-
|Win
|align=center|22–6
|Fabricio Oliveira
|Submission (arm-triangle choke)
|Aspera Fighting Championship 50
|
|align=center|2
|align=center|2:01
|Santa Catarina, Brazil
|
|-
|Win
|align=center|21–6
|Jadison Costa
|TKO (punches)
|XFC i 12
|
|align=center|2
|align=center|2:40
|Sao Paulo, Brazil
|
|-
|Win
|align=center|20–6
|E. J. Brooks
|Decision (unanimous)
|Arena Tour 6: Tirloni vs. Brooks
|
|align=center|3
|align=center|5:00
|Córdoba, Argentina
|
|-
|Win
|align=center|19–6
|Alejandro Solano Rodriguez
|Decision (unanimous)
|CP: Calvo Promotions 5
|
|align=center|3
|align=center|5:00
|San Jose, Costa Rica
|
|-
|Loss
|align=center|18–6
|Pat Healy 
|Decision (split)
|Arena Tour 4: Healy vs. Tirloni
|
|align=center|3
|align=center|5:00
|Buenos Aires, Argentina
|
|-
|Win
|align=center|18–5
|Todd Moore
|TKO (knees)
|Arena Tour 3: Moore vs. Tirloni
|
|align=center|1
|align=center|N/A
|Buenos Aires, Argentina
|
|-
|Win
|align=center|17–5
|Esteban Bonaveri
|TKO (corner stoppage)
|Arena Tour 2: Malegarie vs. Guerra
|
|align=center|2
|align=center|N/A
|Buenos Aires, Argentina
|
|-
|Loss
|align=center|16–5
|Alexander Sarnavskiy
|Submission (triangle choke)
|Bellator 105
|
|align=center|1
|align=center|1:08
|Rio Rancho, New Mexico, United States
|
|-
|Win
|align=center|16–4
|Rich Clementi
|Decision (unanimous)
|Bellator 101
|
|align=center|3
|align=center|5:00
|Portland, Oregon, United States
|
|-
|Loss
|align=center|15–4
|Will Brooks
|Decision (unanimous)
|Bellator 87
|
|align=center|3
|align=center|5:00
|Mount Pleasant, Michigan, United States
|Bellator Season 8 Lightweight Tournament Quarterfinal
|-
|Loss
|align=center|15–3
|Dave Jansen
|Decision (split)
|Bellator 81
|
|align=center|3
|align=center|5:00
|Rhode Island, United States
|Bellator Season 7 Lightweight Tournament Semifinal
|-
|Win
|align=center|15–2
|Renê Nazare
|Submission (D'arce choke)
|Bellator 77
|
|align=center|2
|align=center|1:14
|Reading, Pennsylvania, United States
|Bellator Season 7 Lightweight Tournament Quarterfinal
|-
|Loss
|align=center|14–2
|Rick Hawn
|KO (punches)
|Bellator 62
|
|align=center|1
|align=center|2:36
|Laredo, Texas, United States
|Bellator Season 6 Lightweight Tournament Quarterfinal
|-
|Win
|align=center|14–1
|Steve Gable
|Submission (rear-naked choke)
|Bellator 55
|
|align=center|2
|align=center|3:54
|Yuma, Arizona, United States
|
|-
|Win
|align=center|13–1
|Mauro Chaulet
|KO (head kick)
|Centurion MMA 2
|
|align=center|1
|align=center|1:57
|Itajai, Santa Catarina, Brazil
|
|-
|Win
|align=center|12–1
|Taedas Mendonca
|Decision (unanimous)
|Cage Brazil Championship
|
|align=center|3
|align=center|5:00
|Campo Grande, Mato Grosso do Sul, Brazil
|
|-
|Win
|align=center|11–1
|Alexandre Pedroso
|Submission (D'arce choke)
|Colizeu Fight Championship
|
|align=center|1
|align=center|1:46
|Joacaba, Santa Catarina, Brazil
|
|-
|Win
|align=center|10–1
|Sidmar Neco
|Submission (anaconda choke)
|Brazilian Fight League 7
|
|align=center|1
|align=center|0:53
|Blumenau, Santa Catarina, Brazil
|
|-
|Win
|align=center|9–1
|Brian Cobb
|Submission (rear-naked choke)
|Top Combat Championship 1
|
|align=center|1
|align=center|1:59
|San Juan, Puerto Rico
|
|-
|Win
|align=center|8–1
|Dan Russom
|Submission (triangle choke)
|AOF 3 - Rumble at Robarts 3
|
|align=center|2
|align=center|2:56
|Sarasota, Florida, United States
|
|-
|Win
|align=center|7–1
|Nilson Pereira
|Decision (unanimous)
|Floripa Fight 5
|
|align=center|3
|align=center|5:00
|Florianópolis, Santa Catarina, Brazil
|
|-
|Win
|align=center|6–1
|Ernandez Gonzales
|Submission (triangle choke)
|Spartan 1
|
|align=center|1
|align=center|4:12
|Itapema, Santa Catarina, Brazil
|
|-
|Win
|align=center|5–1
|Pedro Dinamite
|KO (punch)
|Balneario Camboriu Fight
|
|align=center|2
|align=center|4:19
|Balneario Camboriu, Santa Catarina, Brazil
|
|-
|Win
|align=center|4–1
|Murilo Faraco
|Submission (rear-naked choke)
|Dukeoom of Asgar
|
|align=center|1
|align=center|0:51
|Florianópolis, Brazil
|
|-
|Loss
|align=center|3–1
|Benson Henderson
|Submission (guillotine choke)
|MFC 17 - Hostile Takeover
|
|align=center|2
|align=center|3:49
|Enoch, Alberta, Canada
|
|-
|Win
|align=center|3–0
|Anthony Morrison
|KO (punch)
|Combat Sport Challenge: Tirloni vs. Morrison
|
|align=center|1
|align=center|0:40
|Richmond, Virginia, United States
|
|-
|Win
|align=center|2–0
|Jason Howard
|KO (knees and punches)
|Ultimate Cage Fighting - Rage in the Cage
|
|align=center|1
|align=center|0:59
|Murray, Kentucky, United States
|
|-
|Win
|align=center|1–0
|Alessandro Cordeiro
|TKO (doctor stoppage)
|X-treme Combat
|
|align=center|2
|align=center|4:15
|Brazil
|
|}

References

External links

1983 births
Brazilian male mixed martial artists
Lightweight mixed martial artists
Mixed martial artists utilizing Brazilian jiu-jitsu
Brazilian practitioners of Brazilian jiu-jitsu
People awarded a black belt in Brazilian jiu-jitsu
Sportspeople from Santa Catarina (state)
Living people